Mr. Christmas is the first Christmas album and fifth studio album by American country music artist Joe Diffie. It was released on September 19, 1995, through Epic Records. The song "Leroy the Redneck Reindeer" was released as a single, peaking at #33 on the U.S. Billboard Hot Country Singles & Tracks (now Hot Country Songs) charts that year. Otherwise, the album features a mix of traditional Christmas music and newly penned songs.

Track listing

Personnel
Credits listed from AllMusic.
Vocals
Danny Bailey – background vocals
Lea Jane Berinati — background vocals
Lee Bogan – background vocals
Joe Diffie – lead vocals, background vocalist
Janie Fricke – background vocals
Ricky Skaggs – guest vocals
Larry Keith – background vocals

Musicians

Stuart Duncan - fiddle
Paul Franklin – steel guitar
Carl Gorodetzky – string contractor
Terry McMillan – harmonica, percussion
Brent Mason – electric guitar
The Nashville String Machine – strings
Matt Rollings –  keyboards
Billy Joe Walker Jr. – acoustic guitar
Bergen White – string arrangements
Lonnie Wilson – drums
Glenn Worf – bass guitar

Production

Mike Bradley – engineer, mixing
Madeline Bridges – director
Mark Capps – engineer
Joe Diffie – arranger, audio production, producer
Caroline Greyshock – photography
Marilyn Shadinger — director
Johnny Slate – arranger, audio production, producer

Chart performance

References

1995 Christmas albums
Christmas albums by American artists
Country Christmas albums
Joe Diffie albums
Epic Records albums